Aadmi is a 1993 Indian Hindi-language action film directed by Arshad Khan, starring Mithun Chakraborty, Gautami, Harish and Ajit Khan. The film features a score and soundtrack composed by Jatin–Lalit, while Anwar Sagar wrote the lyrics.

Plot
Aadmi is the story of an honest man (Vijay M. Srivastav) and his fight against corruption and the country's traitors, but he is trapped and jailed for a crime (murder of his own parents and brother), which he never committed. Vijay Srivastav had lived a middle-classed lifestyle in Bombay along with dad, Mohanlal, mom, Sharda, and a younger brother, Raju. His father and brother managed a restaurant named "Sahiba", while Vijay worked as a Supervisor at the Ordnance Factory that manufacturers RDX for the Government of India and also moonlighted as a self-defense instructor. He met with wealthy Rekha, the only daughter of Advocate Saxena, and both fell in love with each other.

Their respective parents met and arranged their marriage. While his father went to invite Vijay's office boss Trikal, he witnessed Trikal's terrorist activities. Trikal and his son-in-law, Minister D. P. Singh were involved with anti-state activities. They sent two henchmen to kill the family of Vijay. In a bomb blast, all three members of Vijay's family were murdered and Vijay was arrested by the police and charged with killing his parents and brother, tried in court, found guilty, and sentenced to five years in jail. On his first day behind bars, he is approached by jailor Samsher Singh as well as DCP Deshmikh, who asks him to cooperate and abduct one Deepak, the son of an underworld don, and if he does so, he will not only aid the police, but his crime will be pardoned and he will be released.

He comes out of jail, abducts Deepak and returns to jail with good faith, but later he realizes that Deepak has nothing to do with any underworld don, but he is the son of an honest man, Hiralal. The whole trap was made by his ex boss Trikal. Corrupt DCP Deshmukh is working for Trikal. Now Vijay bursts out in anger and fled from the jail to destroy all his enemies. Among other things, this film was notable for well known villain Shakti Kapoor's rare positive role of an honest police officer.

Cast
Mithun Chakraborty as Vijay M. Srivastav
Gautami as Rekha Saxena, Vijay's lover.
Harish Kumar as Deepak
Ajit Khan as Trikaal
Paresh Rawal as Dhar Pakad aka "D.P." Singh
Raza Murad as Heeralal
Vikas Anand as Mohanlal Srivastav
Arjun as Trikaal's Goon
Sulabha Arya as Sharda M. Srivastav
Rakesh Bedi as Usmaan
Gulshan Grover as DCP Yeshwant Deshmukh
Shakti Kapoor  as I.G. Pratap Singh
Dalip Tahil as Jailor Shamsher Singh
Javed Khan as Prison inmate – Barber
Mushtaq Khan as Public Prosecutor
Mac Mohan as Dhar Pakad Singh's assistant
Anjana Mumtaz as Heeralal's wife
Jonny Skolnick as Raji Viswanathan
Yunus Parvez as Advocate Saxena, Rekha's father.
Tej Sapru as Goga, Trikaal's goon
Rana Jung Bahadur as Trikaal's goon
Mahavir Shah as Inspector Khatre
Birbal as Traffic Constable
Bob Christo as John
Dinesh Anand as Tiwari, Police Official in jail
Disco Shanti as Dancer

Soundtrack

References

External links
 

1993 films
1990s Hindi-language films
Films scored by Jatin–Lalit
Mithun's Dream Factory films
Films shot in Ooty
Indian action films